Mag Pai Zai is the third album from singer-songwriter Declan O'Rourke, released in 2011.

Track list
 Slíeve Bloom
 Time Machine
 A Little Something
 Be Brave and Believe
 Lightning Bird Wind River Man
 Langley's Requiem
 Dancing Song
 Caterpillar DNA
 Orphan Wind Song
 The Hardest Fight
 The Old Black Crow

References

Declan O'Rourke albums
2011 albums